The following radio stations broadcast on FM frequency 90 MHz:

China 
 CNR Music Radio in Beijing
 CNR The Voice of China in Maoming
 alternative frequency for Wuhan News Radio (formerly CRI News Radio, converted in 2020)

Germany
 BR24 news station (with Data Radio Channel) in Munich, Bavaria

Indonesia
Elshinta News and Talk

Tonga
Radio Tonga 2/Kool 90 FM

United Kingdom
BBC Radio 2 (Sandgate, Kent transmitter)

References

Lists of radio stations by frequency